Faction Punk is an uncensored punk rock channel on Sirius XM Satellite Radio. Airing on channel 314, its focus is specifically modern punk rock.

Prior to the temporary replacement of the channel for GNR radio, Faction was branded as just Faction and played a mix of hard rock, hip hop, heavy metal along with punk rock. It would also air an afternoon re-broadcast of The Jason Ellis Show, which used to air live on the channel when it was known as Faction with Jason Ellis, before Ellis' show moved to the re-branded Faction Talk in January 2017.

Faction Punk was previously home to Marky Ramone's Punk Rock Blitzkrieg, Tim Armstrong's "Tim Timebomb and Friends", The Voice Boyce Show with Dave "The Voice" Boyce, Do It Yourself Radio, Tony Hawk's Demolition Radio, and hourly FU's (Faction Updates).

History 
Prior to the merger of Sirius Satellite Radio and XM Satellite Radio, Faction appeared on Sirius channel 41,  (and before that channel 28, while on XM Satellite Radio it appeared on channel 41, and before that channel 52 where it replaced Fungus 53 on November 12, 2008.  It also appeared on Dish Network channel 6041.  It is also one of five alternative rock channels on Sirius XM Radio (the others are Alt Nation, 1st Wave, Lithium and SiriusXMU).

In mid-July 2017, Faction was temporarily replaced by Guns N Roses radio. On August 17, 2017, Turbo, Sirius XM's channel for hard rock from the 1990s and 2000s switched channel numbers with Faction. This meant that Faction moved to channel 314, Turbo's previous channel and was immediately rebranded as Faction Punk, switching its format to a punk rock-exclusive channel. Faction Punk is currently available on select Sirius XM radios, Sirius XM streaming, and the Sirius XM smartphone app.

In mid-2018, Faction Punk would change its format once again, switching to a modern punk rock format as the classic punk-based show Marky Ramone's Punk Rock Blitzkrieg became promoted to a SiriusXM channel (Channel 712).

Skateboarding icon Tony Hawk previously hosted a program on the station titled Tony Hawk's Demolition Radio.

Core artists
Green Day
NOFX
Pennywise
Blink-182
Rancid
Social Distortion
The Offspring
Bad Religion
Rise Against
Against Me!
Bouncing Souls

References

See also
 List of Sirius Satellite Radio stations

Sirius Satellite Radio channels
XM Satellite Radio channels
Sirius XM Radio channels
Punk rock